1-Methylnicotinamide (trigonellamide) is a prototypic organic cation. 1-Methylnicotinamide is the methylated amide of Nicotinamide (niacinamide, vitamin B3).

1-Methylnicotinamide is an endogenic substance that is produced in the liver when Nicotinamide is metabolized. It is a typical substance secreted in the kidney.

Occurrence 
The highest natural concentration of 1-methylnicotinamide found so far is in the alga Undaria pinnatifida. 1-Methylnicotinamide is also present in the Judas' ear fungus and in green tea.

Extraction and production 
1-Methylnicotinamide can be produced in the liver by nicotinamide N-methyltransferase. The reaction takes place during the metabolism of NAD (nicotinamide adenine dinucleotide).

NNMT (nicotinamide N-methyltransferase) is an enzyme that in humans is encoded by the NNMT gene.  NNMT catalyzes the methylation of nicotinamide and similar compounds using the methyl donor S-adenosyl methionine (SAM-e) to produce S-adenosyl--homocysteine (SAH) and 1-methylnicotinamide. NNMT is highly expressed in the human liver.

Use 
For a long time, 1-methylnicotinamide was considered a biologically inactive metabolite of nicotinamide. However, various studies show antithrombotic, anti-inflammatory, gastroprotective and vasoprotective properties.

1-Methylnicotinamide is an endogenous activator of prostacyclin synthesis and can therefore regulate thrombolytic and inflammatory processes in the cardiovascular system. It inhibits platelet-dependent thrombosis through a mechanism involving cyclooxygenase-2 and prostacyclin and increases nitric oxide bioavailability in the endothelium.

Animal experiments with diabetic rats have shown that 1-methylnicotinamide has a positive effect on degenerative changes in the brain and cognitive performance can be thus longer maintained.

Experiments with the nematode Caenorhabditis elegans showed that the addition of 1-methylnicotinamide can extend their lifespan. This may possibly be attributed to increased free radical binding and the resulting reduced oxidative stress.

1-Methylnicotinamide is used in cosmetic products such as hair- and skincare products and as a dietary supplement.

References

Drugs acting on the genito-urinary system
Cations
Nicotinamides
Pyridinium compounds